Bomba and the Hidden City is a 1950 American adventure film. It was the fourth film in the 12-film Bomba, the Jungle Boy series.

This is the first Bomba movie to be filmed outdoors.

Plot
A photographer and his guide meet a corrupt Emir with a dirty secret. Only Bomba knows the truth and the Emir wants him silenced. Bomba defeats the Emir and his henchmen, returning a lost princess to her throne.

Cast
 Johnny Sheffield as Bomba
 Sue England as Zidah
 Paul Guilfoyle as Hassan
 Damian O'Flynn as Dennis Johnson
 Leon Belasco as Raschid
 Charles La Torre as Abdullah
 Smoki Whitfield as Hadji

References

External links
 
 The Hidden City at TCMDB

1950 films
American adventure films
Films directed by Ford Beebe
Films produced by Walter Mirisch
Monogram Pictures films
1950 adventure films
American black-and-white films
1950s English-language films
1950s American films